Sapranthus palanga, commonly known as palanca, is a species of cauliflorous tree in the family Annonaceae, native to the tropical regions of Central America, especially Costa Rica.

This species was recently separated from Sapranthus violaceus, on the basis of cauliflory (flowers emerging from the side of stem instead of shoots).

The flowers are dark purple when mature and emit amines such as putrescine and cadaverine which mimic the smell of a rotting carcass to attract target pollinating agents such as flies.

Footnotes

References 
  (2018): Revision of the Neotropical genus Sapranthus (Annonaceae) PDF fulltext

 Zamora, N.1999. Annonaceae. En Manual de Plantas de Costa Rica. Missouri Botanical Garden- Instituto Nacional de Biodiversidad- Museo Nacional de Costa Rica.

Annonaceae
Cauliflory
Trees of Costa Rica

Trees of Central America
Trees of El Salvador